Ectoganus is a fossil genus of mammals belonging to the family Stylinodontidae.

The species of this genus are found in Northern America.

Species:
 Ectoganus bighornensis Schoch, 1981 
 Ectoganus copei Schoch, 1981 
 Ectoganus gliriformis Cope, 1874

References

Cimolestans
Prehistoric mammal genera